RMS Alaunia was an ocean liner owned by the Cunard Line. She was built in 1913 at Greenock and measured 13,405 tons gross. She was one of the three ships Cunard ordered Scotts Shipbuilding and Engineering Company to build. The Alaunia was the second of these three ships. She and her sisters had only 2nd class and 3rd class.

Alaunia was launched on 9 June 1913, and made her maiden voyage on 27 December 1913. When World War I began, she was requisitioned as a troopship. HMS Alaunia was the first Cunard ship to transport Canadian troops. She was sent in the Gallipoli campaign by the summer of 1915. Then she worked on carrying troops to Bombay later the same year. She returned to the North Atlantic and carried troops from Canada and America in 1916.

After attempts to beach the ship and tow her to shore with tugs, her captain realized the ship was lost and finally gave the order to abandon ship. Two crew members lost their lives in her sinking. Today, the wreck of the Alaunia lies on its port side in the English Channel in 36 metres (115 feet) of water.

Cunard revived the name in 1925 when they built a second , which served until 1957.

References

 

Ships of the Cunard Line
Passenger ships of the United Kingdom
1913 ships
Troop ships of the United Kingdom
Maritime incidents in 1916
Ships sunk by mines
Ships sunk by German submarines in World War I
World War I shipwrecks in the English Channel